The Invasion of Southern France may refer to:

 the French Revolutionary Wars invasion attempts to defeat the French Revolution
 the 1793 War of the Pyrenees, luso-spanish forces supported by the British navy attempted to invade southern France
 the 1793 Siege of Toulon, led by a British-backed force of French Emigres
 the 1814 Campaign in south-west France, a British-led coalition invaded Napoleon's France to the south
 the World War II invasions
 the June 1940 Italian invasion of France, started by Fascist Italy's invasion of the Alps
 the August 1944 Operation Dragoon, the Allied invasion of the south of France